Sea Dart, or GWS.30 was a Royal Navy surface-to-air missile system designed in the 1960s and entering service in 1973. It was fitted to the Type 42 destroyers (United Kingdom and Argentina), Type 82 destroyer and s of the Royal Navy. Originally developed by Hawker Siddeley, the missile was built by British Aerospace after 1977. It was withdrawn from service in 2012.

Britain's first naval surface-to-air missile was GWS1 Seaslug, which entered service in 1963. This used beam riding guidance which offered limited accuracy and was useful only against slower targets. The need for a higher performance system was seen even as it entered service. Bristol Aerospace, which had recently introduced the ramjet-powered Bloodhound missile for the RAF, won the ensuing competition with another ramjet design. Compared to Seaslug, Sea Dart was faster, had much greater range, and its semi-active radar homing guidance was much more accurate and allowed attacks against supersonic targets.

The system had nine confirmed successful engagements in combat, including six aircraft, a helicopter and two anti-ship missiles. An additional helicopter was shot down in a 'friendly fire' incident during the Falklands War.

History
From the immediate post-WWII era, the Royal Navy had been looking for a general-purpose weapon to arm small ships. After the experience with German glide bombs during the war, the primary concern was the development of a medium-range surface-to-air missile able to shoot down the carrier bombers before they could approach the ships. The secondary anti-ship role was later reduced in importance.

Early experiments during the 1950s lead to the development of the Seaslug system. Seaslug was useful against first-generation strike aircraft but had limited performance against faster aircraft or anti-ship missiles. Seaslug was also too large to be carried by a frigate-sized ship, leaving smaller ships with little air defence. Some consideration was given to a high-performance gun system for these ships, the DACR (direct-action, close-range), but calculations showed it would ultimately be useless against future anti-ship missiles that would manoeuvre on the approach.

In October 1960, the Navy launched the Small Ship Integrated Guided Weapon project to fill this need, SIGS for short. This called for a weapon small enough to be carried on a 3,000 ton frigate and able to attack bombers, anti-shipping missiles, and other ships up to frigate size. Seaslug had taken much longer to develop than expected and was a very costly, ongoing program. There was some concern that development of new system should not commence before Seaslug was in service. A review by the Defence Research Policy Committee agreed with the Navy that the new design represented an entirely new class of weapon and that development should be undertaken.

Two systems were considered for the role, Bristol's CF.299 design using a ramjet with a small rocket booster launching it up to speed, and an adaptation of the Army's Sightline project, which would later emerge as Rapier. CF.299 was ultimately chosen. A 1966 report estimated that CF.299 would have a two-shot kill probability (Pk) against an AS-2 Kipper missile of 0.8–0.9, whereas Seaslug II would manage only 0.35–0.55. Against a supersonic "Blinder" bomber, Pk was 0.5–0.8, compared to 0.3–0.5 for Seaslug. Additionally, because it flew faster than Seaslug, the total engagement time was shorter, and this meant the battery could salvo more rapidly. Finally, its ability to lead the target, compared to Seaslug's beam riding pursuit course, allowed it to attack targets with much higher crossing speeds. A 1968 study suggested Sea Dart would have the same capability as eight F-4 Phantoms on patrol.

By this time many foreign navies had chosen the US RIM-24 Tartar surface-to-air missiles, but the Dutch Navy remained interested in the design. They envisioned it being used with a new dedicated air-defence ship, controlled by a significantly more powerful radar, which the British referred to as the Type 988 "Broomstick". This was a 3D radar similar to the US AN/SPY-1 that was under development at the same time. Both the radar and missiles would be controlled by a new combat direction system being developed by both navies. During testing, the system proved to have excellent performance, in one case intercepting a 4.5-inch shell in flight.

Ultimately, the Dutch also chose Tartar for their missile component, leaving the Royal Navy as the Sea Dart's only initial user. The missile system was also fitted to Invincible-class aircraft carriers but was removed during refits between 1998 and 2000 to increase the area of the flight deck and below-decks stowage associated with the operation of Royal Air Force Harrier GR9 aircraft.

Design

It is launched using a drop-off Chow solid-fuel booster that accelerates it to the supersonic speed necessary for the operation of the cruise motor, a Rolls-Royce /Bristol Siddeley kerosene-fuelled Odin ramjet. This gives a cruise speed of over Mach 2.5, and unlike many rocket-powered designs, the cruise engine burns for the entire flight, giving excellent terminal manoeuvrability at extreme range.

It is capable of engaging targets out to at least  over a wide range of altitudes.

Guidance is by proportional navigation and a semi-active radar homing system using the nose intake cone and four aerials around the intake as an interferometer aerial, with targets being identified by a Type 1022 surveillance radar (originally radar Type 965) and illuminated by one of a pair of radar Type 909. This allows two targets to be engaged simultaneously in initial versions, with later variants able to engage more. Firing is from a twin-arm trainable launcher that is loaded automatically from below decks. The original launcher seen on HMS Bristol was significantly larger than that which appeared on Type 42 and Invincible classes. Initial difficulties with launcher reliability were resolved.

Combat service

Falklands War

Sea Dart was used during the Falklands War (1982) and is credited with seven confirmed kills (plus one British Aérospatiale Gazelle helicopter downed by friendly fire). Kills were made against a high-flying aircraft beyond the missile's stated technical envelope and low-flying attack aircraft.

The net effect of Sea Dart was to deny the higher altitudes to enemy aircraft. This was important because Argentine aircraft such as the Mirage III had better straight line performance than the Sea Harriers, which were unlikely to successfully intercept them.

On 25 May 1982 an A-4C Skyhawk of Grupo 5 was shot down north of Pebble Island, again by Coventry. The pilot, Capitán Hugo Angel del Valle Palaver, was killed. Later, Coventry shot down another Skyhawk of Grupo 4 while it was returning from a mission to San Carlos Water. Capitán Jorge Osvaldo García successfully ejected but was not recovered. The next Argentine action that day sank Coventry. An unguided Sea Dart was launched in an effort to disrupt the attack but missed, and the destroyer was struck by two iron bombs and sank.

The same day a Super Étendard strike fighter sought to attack the British carrier group with Exocet missiles, but instead struck the cargo ship .  fired six Sea Darts in less than two minutes, but all missed.

On 6 June 1982, Cardiff fired a Sea Dart missile at an aircraft believed to be an Argentine C-130 Hercules. The missile destroyed the aircraft, which was in fact a British Army helicopter. All four occupants were killed in this "friendly-fire" incident.

Finally, on 13 June 1982, an English Electric Canberra flying at  en route to bomb British troops near Port Harriet House was destroyed by a Sea Dart fired from Cardiff.

In total at least eighteen missiles were launched by Type 42 destroyers, six by Invincible, and two by Bristol. Out of five missiles fired against helicopters or high flying aircraft, four were successful, but only two of nineteen fired at low level aircraft hit: just eleven per cent; however a number of missiles were fired without guidance to deter low level attacks. Exeters success can be partially attributed to being equipped with the Type 1022 radar, which was designed for the system and provided greater capability than the old Type 965 fitted to the earlier Type 42s. The Type 965 was unable to cope with low level targets as it suffered multiple path crossings and targets became lost in radar clutter from the surface of the South Atlantic. This resulted in Sea Dart being unable to lock onto targets at distance obscured by land, or fast-moving low-level targets obscured in ground clutter or sea-returns.

The Argentine Navy was well aware of the Sea Dart's capabilities and limitations, having two Type 42s of its own. Consequently, Argentine planes, opting to fly below the Type 965 radar ("sea skimming"), frequently dropped bombs which failed to explode. The arming vane on the bomb had insufficient time to complete the number of revolutions required to arm the fuze.

Persian Gulf War (1991)
In February 1991 during the Persian Gulf War the battleship  was operating in the Persian Gulf. Her battlegroup included a number of escorts, including the Type 42 destroyer . On 24 February, Missouri was fired on by a pair of Silkworm anti-ship missiles. Although one missed completely, the other was engaged and destroyed by a Sea Dart fired by HMS Gloucester, while another of the battleship's escorts, the frigate , attempted to engage with its Phalanx CIWS, but succeeded only in firing at the chaff launched by Missouri.

Variants
The Sea Dart was upgraded over the years - notably its electronics - as technology advanced. The following modification standards have been fielded:
 Mod 0 Basic 1960s version, used in the Falklands. valve technology. Range circa .
 Mod 1 Improved Sea Dart. Upgraded version 1983–1986. Updated guidance systems possibly allowing some capability against sea-skimming targets and much greater reliability.
 Mod 2 1989–1991. Upgrade included ADIMP (Air Defence IMProvement) which saw the replacement of six old circuit cards in the guidance system with one, allowing the spare volume to be used for an autopilot.
 Mod 3 Latest version with new infrared fuze. Delayed eight years from 1994 to 2002.

The Sea Dart Mark 2, GWS 31, (also known as Sea Dart II - not to be confused with Mod 2, above) development was cancelled in 1981. This was intended to allow 'off the rail' manoeuvres with additional controls added to the booster. The Mark 2 was reduced to Advanced Sea Dart, then Enhanced Sea Dart and finally Improved Sea Dart.

Lightweight Sea Dart was a version with minimal changes to the missile itself, but based in a new sealed box-launcher. A four-box trainable launcher was developed that allowed it to be mounted to ships as small as 300 tons displacement. The same box and launcher could also support the Sea Eagle SL, the proposed ship-launched version of Sea Eagle. Guardian was a proposed land-based system of radars, control stations and the Lightweight Sea Dart proposed in the 1980s for use as a land-based air defence system for the Falkland Islands. Neither system was put into production.

Withdrawal

The Sea Dart-equipped Type 42s reached the end of their service lives, with all vessels already retired. They were replaced by the larger Type 45 which are armed with the Sea Viper missile system which is much more capable in the anti-air role. The first-of-class began sea trials in July 2007 and Daring entered service in 2009.

On 13 April 2012  fired the last operational Sea Dart missiles after a thirty-year career. The last two remaining Type 42s,  and Edinburgh completed their careers without the system being operational.

A launcher with drill missiles has been preserved and is on display at Explosion! Museum of Naval Firepower, Gosport, Hampshire.

Operators

Former operators

Notes

References

Citations

Bibliography

 
 Britain's Modern Royal Navy, Paul Beaver, Patrick Stephens Limited, 1996 
 Naval Armament, Doug Richardson, Jane's Publishing, 1981, 
 War Machines enciclopedy, Limited publishing, 1984 page 866 (Italian version printed by De Agostini) and page 1260-1268
 Enciclopedy War Machines, 1265–70 and 864-65 (Italian edition)

See also

Naval surface-to-air missiles
Naval weapons of the United Kingdom
Ramjet engines
Surface-to-air missiles of the United Kingdom
Military equipment introduced in the 1970s